Betsy West is an American producer, filmmaker, and video journalist. With Julie Cohen, she has directed four biographical documentary films focusing on American women: RBG (2018), My Name is Pauli Murray (2021), Julia (2021) and Gabby Giffords Won't Back Down (2022). She received the Cinema for Peace Award for Women's Empowerment for her film RBG. She is the Fred W. Friendly Professor of Professional Practice in Media Society Emeritus, at the Columbia University Graduate School of Journalism.

Early life 
West attended the Wheeler School in Providence, Rhode Island. She matriculated at Brown University, graduating in 1973. West earned a Master's in Communications from the S. I. Newhouse School of Public Communications at Syracuse University in 1974.

She is married to fellow documentary filmmaker Oren Jacoby.

References 

Year of birth missing (living people)
Brown University alumni
S.I. Newhouse School of Public Communications alumni
Columbia University Graduate School of Journalism faculty
American documentary film directors
American documentary film producers
Living people
American women documentary filmmakers